Cannabis in Missouri is legal for recreational use. A ballot initiative to legalize recreational use passed by a 53–47 margin on November 8, 2022. Possession for adults 21 and over became legal on December 8, 2022, with the first licensed sales occurring on February 3, 2023.

Medical use was legalized through the passage of a 2018 ballot measure by a 66–34 margin. The first licensed sales began in October 2020.

State level

Partial decriminalization (2014)
In May 2014, Senate Bill 491 was enacted which reduced penalties for certain cannabis offenses.  In particular, it eliminated the threat of jail time for first-time possession of up to 10 grams.  The bill also reduced penalties related to the sale and cultivation of cannabis, and eliminated the ban on probation or parole for third-time drug felony convictions.  It passed the Senate by a 29–2 vote and the House 140–15, then became law without receiving the signature of Gov. Jay Nixon.  SB 491 did not take effect until January 2017.

Although penalties for cannabis were reduced under SB 491, possession of small amounts is still treated as a misdemeanor crime.  For this reason the National Organization for the Reform of Marijuana Laws considered Missouri to only have partially decriminalized cannabis.

CBD oil legalized (2014)
In July 2014, Governor Jay Nixon signed into law House Bill 2238 – the Missouri Medical Marijuana Bill – to legalize the use of CBD oil to treat persistent seizures. The legislation "allows the Department of Agriculture to grow industrial hemp for research purposes and allows the use of hemp extract to treat certain individuals with epilepsy". A neurologist must determine that the epilepsy does not respond to at least three treatment options in order for a person to be eligible. HB 2238 only allows hemp extract that contains at least 5% cannabidiol (CBD) and no more than 0.3% tetrahydrocannabinol (THC).

In February 2015, the state issued licenses to two non-profits to grow cannabis to produce the oil.

Medical cannabis legalized (2018)
In November 2018, Missouri residents approved with 66% of the vote a ballot measure (Amendment 2) to legalize the medical use of cannabis.  The measure allows qualified patients to grow up to six cannabis plants and purchase an amount of cannabis per month to be determined by state regulators (required to be at least 4 ounces).  The measure set a 4% tax rate on medical cannabis sales with proceeds to be earmarked for services for military veterans.  Although several qualifying conditions are specified, the law additionally allows cannabis to be recommended for any "chronic, debilitating or other medical condition" for which a physician determines there would be a benefit, as well as for any terminal illness.

Also on the ballot with Amendment 2 were two other medical cannabis initiatives that were defeated.  Amendment 3 contained a narrower set of qualifying conditions, a higher tax rate of 15 percent, and would not have allowed home cultivation.  It failed with 32 percent of the vote.  A third measure, Proposition C, was a statutory change as opposed to a constitutional amendment.  It set a two percent tax rate and also contained no home grow provision.  It failed with 44 percent of the vote.

The first licensed sales of medical cannabis occurred on October 17, 2020.  By this time there were 192 licensed dispensaries in the state, most of which were expected to open by the end of the year.

Recreational cannabis legalized (2022)

On August 9, 2022, Secretary of State Jay Ashcroft announced that an initiative would appear on the November 2022 ballot to legalize cannabis for recreational use. Designated as Amendment 3 on the ballot, the initiative sought to:

 allow adults 21 and over to possess up to three ounces of cannabis
 allow home cultivation of six flowering cannabis plants, six nonflowering plants, and six clones for registered individuals who pay a $100 annual fee
 allow the sale of cannabis at dispensaries licensed by the state with a 6% sales tax imposed
 divide tax revenue up between expunging non-violent cannabis offenses, providing healthcare for veterans, providing substance abuse treatment, and funding the state's public defender system
 allow local governments to assess a sales tax of up to 3%

On November 8, 2022, Missouri voters approved Amendment 3 by a 53–47 margin. Possession of cannabis for adults 21 and over became legal on December 8, 2022. The first licensed sales of recreational cannabis occurred on February 3, 2023.

Municipal level

Columbia (2004)
In November 2004, a ballot measure to decriminalize cannabis in Columbia passed with 61% of the vote.  The measure stipulated that possession of up to 35 grams was to be processed in municipal court as a non-criminal offense, punishable by a maximum fine of $250.  Also passed with 69% of the vote was an initiative to allow the use of cannabis with a physician's approval.

A year earlier, in April 2003, a ballot measure to decriminalize cannabis in the city failed with 42% of the vote.

Springfield (2012)
In August 2012, the city council of Springfield voted 6–3 to enact (rather than let go to ballot) a citizen-led petition to decriminalize small amounts of cannabis.  It was then repealed one month later, however, in effect blocking the proposal (which had obtained the requisite number of signatures) from appearing on the ballot.  Since city council did not have this explicit power, organizers of the petition denounced the council's actions which they deemed to be illegal.  A lawsuit was filed in federal court, and in April 2015 the city settled with the petition originators in the amount of $225,000.

St. Louis (2013)
In April 2013, the St. Louis Board of Aldermen voted 22–3 to allow police to cite individuals instead of arresting them for small amounts of cannabis.  Cited persons would be processed in municipal court (instead of state court) and subject to a fine in the range of 100 to 500 dollars.  The law went into effect in June 2013.

Penalties were further reduced in February 2018 when the Board of Aldermen voted 24–0 to set a $25 fine for possession of up to 35 grams.

Kansas City (2017)
In April 2017, Kansas City residents approved with 75% of the vote a ballot measure to decriminalize up to 35 grams of cannabis.  The measure eliminated the threat of jail time and reduced the penalty to a $25 fine.  The penalty was later completely eliminated in July 2020 by a 9–4 city council vote.

St. Louis (2021)
In November 2021, the St. Louis Board of Aldermen voted 23–0 to allow the possession of up to two ounces of cannabis and the cultivation of six plants under city law. The bill also prevents "adverse employer actions based on a positive drug test" for city employees who are medical cannabis patients and prohibits police from using the sight or smell of cannabis as the sole basis for police to stop someone.

References

 
Missouri
Crime in Missouri
Missouri culture
Politics of Missouri